Rekha Das  is an Indian actress in the Kannada film industry. Some of the notable films of Rekha Das as an actress include Shwethaagni (1991), Shanthi Kranthi (1991), and Hoovu Hannu (1993).

Personal life
She was married to Kannada film director and producer Om Prakash Rao and has a daughter Shravya who is also an actress.

Career 
Rekha Das has been part of more than six hundred and fifty films and many television series in Kannada. She and comedian Tennis Krishna, have acted in one hundred films together.

Selected filmography

 Rudra Tandava (1990)
 Mruthyunjaya (1990)...Sridevi
 Gopi Krishna (1992) 
 Malashree Mamashree (1992)
 Karpoorada Gombe (1996)
 Ammavra Ganda (1997) 	
 Arjun Abhimanyu (1998)
 Mangalyam Tantunanena (1998)
 Friends (2002)
 Simhadriya Simha (2002)
 Aunty Preethse (2001)
 Maurya (2004)
 Manasugula Mathu Madhura (2008)
 Godfather (2012)
 Aryan (2014)
 Saahasi Makkalu (2018)
 Drona (2020)

See also

List of people from Karnataka
Cinema of Karnataka
List of Indian film actresses
Cinema of India

References

External links
 

Actresses in Kannada cinema
Living people
Kannada people
Actresses from Karnataka
Actresses from Bangalore
Indian film actresses
21st-century Indian actresses
Actresses in Kannada television
Year of birth missing (living people)